Daklak Football Club, simply known as Daklak, is a professional football club, based in Buôn Mê Thuột, Đắk Lắk, Vietnam that plays in the Vietnamese Second Division, the third tier of Vietnamese football.

History
Daklak was promoted to the 2014 V.League 2 after winning their playoff match between Nam Dinh in November 2013.
2013 season after 10 years of competition in second place teams played excellent and won 2nd Group B with 6 wins, 4 draws after 10 rounds. Date 27/07/2013 official team won promotion to Championship 2014 after a 1–0 win in Nam Dinh. 2015 V.League 2, the team ranked 5th with victory over the People's Public Security official and relegation. 2016 V.League 2, the club has a strong shift to the new coach to replace and strengthen the squad. 2016 V.League 2, the team ranked 6th with victory over the Dong Nai official and relegation.

Daklak is located in the center of the Central Highlands, strategically located strategically in politics, converging all conditions of socio-economic development. Natural resources are diverse, abundant. The level of education and culture has gradually improved. Stable security and defense situation. As a locality with a population of over 1.8 million people, it is very favorable for socio-economic development. In particular, the demand for enjoyment and enjoyment of culture – sports of the ethnic minority in the province, especially football has been loved and won the trust of the province fans.

Daklak is a province with a long history of football, as well as after the liberation of the South, unification of the country 30–4. In 1976, Dak Lak participated in the football competition Truong Son in the central region and in the next year all participated in the A2, A1 national football league, the results are quite good in region and country. As well as having participated in the national first class since the early 1990s.

Present, Daklak province has about 20 football coaches graduated from the University, including 6 coaches in C, 2 coaches in B under the AFC certification and 1 in FIFA management certificates, 2 masters. Trainers are allocated to training and provincial teams.

Concentrated athletes and provincial youth recruits are funded by the State budget. A cultural session, a training session. In general, the quality of training talented athletes and the recruitment of children compared to many other localities in the region and the whole country have invested well. Most athletes from the training resources from the youth gates have supplemented the provincial squad for many years.

Daklak has received the attention and favor of leaders of provincial party committees, People's Committees, agencies and departments in the province. After 10 years playing in second place. The Dak Lak provincial football team made a great effort, determined to win and was transferred to the national first division in 2014.

To mobilize all resources in the society to take care of the provincial football movement and also to improve the performance of the competition, to maintain the target of ranking first football team in province. At the same time, aiming to move to the national championship V.League 1 in the coming years, with the aim of promoting the image, potential, country and people of Daklak on The whole country and the world.

On facilities, equipment and service equipment have been qualified to meet the talent routes, young players and team training and competition. Currently, Buon Ma Thuot Stadium with a capacity of 25,000 seats is one of the largest yards in the Central Region. In the field of grass enough to ensure the organization of national and international competitions.

Daklak continues to build management apparatus towards professionalism. Currently, we are focusing on calling and mobilizing investment enterprises to meet the requirements of the regulation of the Vietnam Football Federation and especially the state budget resources to maintain and develop.
Focusing on consolidating the board of trainings of the many lines. Improve training methods, improve training effectiveness young athletes. Strengthening facilities, nutrition and medical care, investing in science and technology for immediate and long-term training. Regular inspection, evaluation of the essence, boldly, resolutely bar the young athletes ability to weak. Focus on developing and supplementing the force of qualified athletes to be ready for transition to the provincial football team.

Stadium
The stadium of football stadiums Buôn Ma Thuột Stadium, has a capacity of 25,000 seats.

Honours

National competitions
Second League:
 Winners : (1) 2002
 Runners-up : (1) 2013

Current squad
As of 18 August 2022

Kit manufacturers and shirt sponsors

Coaching staff

Managers since 2000
  Võ Thành Danh (2000–2013)
  Trần Phi Ái (2013–2014)
  Lư Đình Tuấn (2014–2015)
  Phan Tôn Lợi (2015)
  Trần Phi Ái (2015–2018)
  Trương Minh Tiến (2019–2021)
  Võ Thành Luân (2022–)

References

External links
 League Website

Football clubs in Vietnam